"Let the Heartaches Begin" is a song performed by British singer Long John Baldry. The single was a number one hit in the UK Singles Chart on 22 November 1967 where it stayed for two weeks.  It was the second of two consecutive UK number one hits for the writing partnership of Tony Macaulay and John Macleod.  The title of the B-side song is "Annabella (Who Flies To Me When She's Lonely)".

Composition and recording
An early version of the song was written by Tony Macaulay a few years before it was recorded. Long John Baldry was a blues singer but did not have much chart success for ten years, and in 1967 he moved from United Artists to Pye Records to pursue a more pop-oriented recording career. Macaulay, who had just written a hit song with John Macleod, "Baby Now That I've Found You", for The Foundations, then met with Baldry to write songs for him. Their initial attempts writing together failed to produce a satisfactory song until Macaulay remembered "Let the Heartaches Begin" that he had previously written. Macleod then joined them and he wrote the second verse of the song, as well as adding a chord or two. Macaulay was not certain that the song would be successful, and credited Macleod's input for turning the song into the hit that it would become.

The song was recorded first with a live orchestra, with orchestral arrangement by Mcleod. Baldry then added the vocal, although as a bluesman he was not used to singing the notes exactly as written on the bar line. He drank brandy copiously while he was recording the vocal, which contributed to the seemingly emotional quality of the sound. Macaulay said of the recording session: "Long John Baldry sings it extraordinarily well, thanks to three-quarters of a bottle of Courvoisier". The song was mixed five times in one day.

Chart performance
The song reached top 10 the second week it was released, and on November 22, 1967 it reached No. 1 after Baldry appeared on Top of the Pops, replacing as No. 1 "Baby Now That I've Found You" that was also written by Macaulay and Mcleod. The song also charted in the United States, peaking at No. 88 on the Billboard Hot 100 the week of 20 January 1968, and in the Republic of Ireland, where the song reached No. 2 in the charts.

Charts

References

UK Singles Chart number-one singles
Songs written by Tony Macaulay
Songs written by John Macleod (songwriter)
Pye Records singles
1967 songs
1967 singles